Lauren Adams may refer to:

 Lauren Adams (character), a character from the CHERUB series
 Lauren Adams (actress) (born 1982), American actress